The Cardinal Community School District is a public school district headquartered in Eldon, Iowa.  It spans areas in Wapello, Davis, Jefferson and Van Buren counties.  It serves the cities of Eldon, Agency, and Batavia, the unincorporated community of Selma, and the surrounding rural areas.

The district was formed in 1960 as a consolidation of schools in Eldon, Agency, Batavia, and Selma.

Joel Pedersen has served as superintendent since 2010.  He was named Iowa Superintendent of the Year by the School Administrators of Iowa in 2020.

Elementary principal Heather Buckley was named Iowa Elementary Principal of the Year in 2022.

Schools
The district operates three schools, all in Eldon:
 Cardinal Elementary School
 Cardinal Junior High School
 Cardinal High School

Cardinal High School

Athletics
The Comets compete in the South Central Conference in the following sports:
Cross Country
Volleyball
Football
Wrestling
Basketball
Track and Field
Baseball
Softball
 2-time Class 1A State Champions (2003, 2004)

See also
List of school districts in Iowa
List of high schools in Iowa

References

External links
 Cardinal Community School District

School districts in Iowa
Education in Wapello County, Iowa
Education in Davis County, Iowa
Education in Jefferson County, Iowa
Education in Van Buren County, Iowa
1960 establishments in Iowa
School districts established in 1960